42 Squadron or 42nd Squadron may refer to:

 No. 42 Squadron RAAF, Australia
 No. 42 Squadron (Finland)
 No. 42 Squadron RNZAF, New Zealand
 No. 42 Squadron RAF, United Kingdom
 42 Radar Squadron, Canada
 42nd Air Refueling Squadron, United States Air Force
 42nd Attack Squadron, United States Air Force
 42nd Electronic Combat Squadron, United States Air Force
 42nd Expeditionary Airlift Squadron, United States Air Force
 42nd Flying Training Squadron, United States Air Force
 42nd Tactical Missile Squadron, United States Air Force
 VA-42 (U.S. Navy), Attack Squadron 42
 Marine Aviation Logistics Squadron 42, United States Marine Corps

See also
 42nd Division (disambiguation)
 42nd Group (disambiguation)
 42nd Brigade (disambiguation)
 42nd Regiment (disambiguation)
 42nd Battalion (disambiguation)